Proto-Munda is the reconstructed proto-language of the Munda languages of South Asia. It has been reconstructed by Sidwell & Rau (2015). According to Sidwell Proto-Munda language split from proto- Austro-asiatic in Indo china and arrived in coast of Odisha around 4000-3500 year ago.

Reconstruction
The following Proto-Munda lexical proto-forms have been reconstructed by Sidwell & Rau (2015: 319, 340-363). Two asterisks are given to denote the tentative, preliminary state of the proto-language reconstruction.

Proto-Munda reconstruction has since been revised and improved by Rau (2019).

See also
Proto-Austroasiatic language

References

Munda languages
Munda